Kim Hong-bok (born 4 March 1935) is a South Korean former footballer who competed in the 1964 Summer Olympics.

References

External links 
 
 
 

1935 births
Living people
South Korean footballers
Olympic footballers of South Korea
Footballers at the 1964 Summer Olympics
Asian Games silver medalists for South Korea
Asian Games medalists in football
Footballers at the 1958 Asian Games
Footballers at the 1962 Asian Games
Medalists at the 1958 Asian Games
AFC Asian Cup-winning players
1956 AFC Asian Cup players
1960 AFC Asian Cup players
Kookmin University alumni
Sportspeople from South Gyeongsang Province
Association football defenders